Kulager Hockey Club («Құлагер» хоккей клубы), commonly referred as Kulager Petropavl, is a professional ice hockey team based in Petropavl, Kazakhstan. They were founded in 2015, and play in the Pro Hokei Ligasy, the top level of ice hockey in Kazakhstan.

References

External links
Official website

Ice hockey teams in Kazakhstan
2015 establishments in Kazakhstan